The 2004 PBA Fiesta Conference, or known as the 2004 Gran Matador Brandy-PBA Fiesta Conference for sponsorship reasons, was tournament held by the Philippine Basketball Association and the first ever edition of the PBA Fiesta Conference.

Prior to the formation of the said conference, the league had two import-laced conferences known as the PBA Commissioner's Cup (with an import height-limit of 6–8), and the PBA Governor's Cup (with an import height-limit of 6–4). However, in 2003, the two conferences were scrapped and was replaced with an Invitational tournament, with an All-Filipino local squad along with foreign teams) and an import-laced Reinforced Conference.

But, in 2004, the league changed its calendar from a calendar year to a fiscal year. As a preparation for the new format, the tournament was institutionalized in 2004 as a transitional tournament. The first Fiesta Conference was played from February–July 2004.

Opening ceremonies
The muses for the participating teams are as follows:

2004 PBA All-Star Game
The league held its All-Star Weekend on August 15, 2004, at the jampacked New Cebu City Coliseum, with the revived North vs South All-Stars format. The South All-Stars defeated the Northern selection, 130–128, in a closely fought contest. Asi Taulava and Jimmy Alapag were named co-MVP of the All-Star Game.

Classification round

Wildcard phase

Quarterfinals

Groupings

Group A

Group B

Two guest teams participated in the tournament, the University of British Columbia men's basketball team and the US Pro-Am Selection. Both never won a single game in the quarterfinals of the tournament.

Bracket

Semifinals

(A1) Talk 'N Text vs. (B2) Barangay Ginebra

(B1) Coca-Cola vs. (A2) Red Bull

Third place playoff

Finals

The Barangay Ginebra Kings ended their seven-year title drought with a 3–1 series victory over Red Bull Barako in the Finals. They became the lowest seed (7th seed) ever to win a PBA championship, to be followed by the San Miguel Beermen in the 2019 PBA Commissioner's Cup.

Awards
Eric Menk of Barangay Ginebra was named the Best Player of the Conference while Red Bull's Victor Thomas is the conference Best Import.

Broadcast notes

References

External links
PBA.ph

PBA Fiesta Conference
2004